The Hoffmann von Fallersleben Prize is an international literary award, awarded by the Hoffmann von Fallersleben Society in memory of poet August Heinrich Hoffmann von Fallersleben, to authors "whose literary, historical or journalistic work demonstrates independent thinking or encourages others to think independently, in the spirit of Hoffmann von Fallersleben".

Winners 
2000 Peter Rühmkorf
2002 Timothy Garton Ash
2004 Hans Joachim Schädlich
2006 Walter Kempowski
2008 Günter de Bruyn
2010 Herta Müller
2012 Karl Schlögel
2014 Juli Zeh
2016 Gerhard Roth
2018 Dieter Grimm

References 

German literary awards